The Taheke River is a river of the Northland Region of New Zealand's North Island. It flows north from its origins in hills to the east of Whangarei reaching the Waitangi River close to its mouth at Ngunguru Bay.

See also
List of rivers of New Zealand

References

Rivers of the Northland Region
Rivers of New Zealand